Doris Peick (September 22, 1933 – July 4, 2012) was an American politician who served in the Iowa House of Representatives from the 52nd district from 1983 to 1987.

She died on July 4, 2012, in Cedar Rapids, Iowa at age 78.

References

1933 births
2012 deaths
Democratic Party members of the Iowa House of Representatives